The Russian Morse code approximates the Morse code for the Latin alphabet. It was enacted by the Russian government in 1856.

To memorize the codes, practitioners use mnemonics known as напевы (loosely translated "melodies" or "chants"). The "melody" corresponding to a character is a sung phrase: syllables containing the vowels а, о, and ы correspond to dashes and are sung long, while syllables containing other vowels, as well the syllable ай, correspond to dots and are sung short. The specific "melodies" employed differ among various schools.

The correspondences between Cyrillic and Latin letters were codified in MTK-2, KOI-7, and KOI-8.

Table & Melody

See also
Morse code
Morse code for non-Latin alphabets

References

External links
Morse code
Morse Code Translator--Morse Decoder
Morse Code Translator

Morse code
Russian language
Cyrillic alphabet representations